Turret Hill, also known as Nui Po Shan, is a peak southeast of Tolo Harbour in the New Territories of Hong Kong. It has a height of 399 metres. The mountain is located in the Sha Tin District.

History
A quarry named Turret Hill Quarry was located on the southeastern flank of Turret Hill. Established in the mid-1960s, it initially served as a borrow area, and was converted into an aggregate quarry in the late 1970s. Rock extraction ceased at the quarry in 1984.

Construction work to move the nearby Sha Tin Sewage Treatment Works to an artificial cave within Nui Po Shan started in 2021.

See also

 List of mountains, peaks and hills in Hong Kong
 Ma On Shan Country Park
 Mining in Hong Kong

References

Further reading
 

Sha Tin District
Tai Shui Hang